Black Oak Creek is a stream in Cass and Henry counties in the U.S. state of Missouri. It is a tributary of Knob Creek.

Black Oak Creek was so named due to the abundance of black oak timber along its course.

See also
List of rivers of Missouri

References

Rivers of Cass County, Missouri
Rivers of Henry County, Missouri
Rivers of Missouri